Luke Dawson is an American screenwriter who is best known for his scripts of the remake of Shutter and the Thriller film The Lazarus Effect.

Life 
1998 had his first work in the film business with the benefactor work, of the drama thriller Pi, after this worked as screenwriter. He wrote the screenplay of Steven Sebring short drama film New York Stories and 2008 the screenplay of US remake Shutter. 2014 co-wrote the screenplay of the Thriller The Lazarus Effect along with Jeremy Slater, which received good ratings from film festivals and critics. He wrote the scripts of the action films Apt. and Executive Assistant Iris, which will be released early 2016. Apt. is his second wrote script, which was produced by Vertigo Entertainment, after the remake Shutter.

Filmography 
Benefactor
 Pi (1998)

Producer
 The Lazarus Effect (2015)

Screenplay:
 New York Stories (2003)
 Shutter (2008)
 The Lazarus Effect (2015)
 Apt. (2015)
 Executive Assistant Iris (2015)
 Adrift (TBA)

References

External links 

American male screenwriters
Year of birth missing (living people)
Living people